Corticelli is an unincorporated community in Moniteau County, in the U.S. state of Missouri.

History
A post office called Corticelli was established in 1895, and remained in operation until 1911. The community derives its name from a brand of silk thread sold at a local store.

References

Unincorporated communities in Moniteau County, Missouri
Unincorporated communities in Missouri
Jefferson City metropolitan area